Avtandil Ebralidze (born 3 October 1991) commonly known as Avto, is a Georgian footballer who plays as a winger for Cypriot club Anorthosis Famagusta.

Club career
Avto began his professional career with fourth division side Esperança de Lagos in 2010 where he remained there one season. Following his spell with the Lagos side, Avto moved to third division side Juventude de Évora. His stay with Juventude de Évora saw him contribute two goals in 27 appearances.

In the summer of 2012, Avto moved to Segunda Liga side Oliveirense. Avto debuted for Oliveirense on 29 July 2012, in a 2012–13 Taça da Liga match against Belenenses where he played 76 minutes. Avto scored his first goal on 16 September 2012, in a 2012–13 Taça de Portugal match against Sintrense which helped his side win the tie 5–1.

Gil Vicente

On the 2 September 2013, the last day of the Portuguese transfer window, saw Avto move to Primeira Liga side Gil Vicente F.C. on a free transfer. Avto made his Gil Vicente debut on the 14 September, against Porto where he come on as a 77th minute.

Doxa Katokopias
On 15 July 2021, Ebralidze move to Cypriot First Division club Doxa Katokopia on a one-year contract until 2022.

Anorthosis Famagusta
On 28 June 2022, Ebralidze signed with Cypriot First Division club Anorthosis Famagusta on a two-year contract until 2024.

International career
On the 6 October 2013, Ebralidze received his first call up to the Georgian national football team. He made his international debut on the 15 October against Spain, where he replaced Shota Grigalashvili in the 70th minute.

References

External links
 
 

1991 births
Living people
Footballers from Georgia (country)
Georgia (country) international footballers
Association football forwards
Segunda Divisão players
Liga Portugal 2 players
Primeira Liga players
Liga I players
Cypriot First Division players
Juventude Sport Clube players
U.D. Oliveirense players
Gil Vicente F.C. players
G.D. Chaves players
C.D. Nacional players
FC Voluntari players
Leixões S.C. players
Doxa Katokopias FC players
Expatriate footballers from Georgia (country)
Expatriate footballers in Portugal
Expatriate footballers in Romania
Expatriate footballers in Cyprus
Expatriate sportspeople from Georgia (country) in Portugal
Expatriate sportspeople from Georgia (country) in Romania
Expatriate sportspeople from Georgia (country) in Cyprus